Pistohlkors is the surname of the following people
Alexander Pistohlkors (1885–1944), Russian Life Guards officer
Alexandra Pistohlkors (1888–1968), wife of  Alexander
Marianne Pistohlkors (1890–1976), Russian-born aristocrat and actress, sister of Alexander
Princess Olga Paley (Olga von Pistohlkors, 1865–1929), Russian nobility, mother of Alexander